Lepimormia is a genus of flies belonging to the family Psychodidae.

Species:
 Lepimormia hemiboreale Salmela & Piirainen, 2005 
 Lepimormia hemiborealis Salmela & Piirainen, 2005

References

Psychodidae